This is a list of the National Register of Historic Places listings in Taos County, New Mexico.

This is intended to be a complete list of the properties and districts on the National Register of Historic Places in Taos County, New Mexico, United States. Latitude and longitude coordinates are provided for many National Register properties and districts; these locations may be seen together in a map.

There are 43 properties and districts listed on the National Register in the county, including seven National Historic Landmarks. All but seven of the National Register listings within the county are also recorded on the New Mexico State Register of Cultural Properties.

Current listings

|}

See also

 List of National Historic Landmarks in New Mexico
 National Register of Historic Places listings in New Mexico

References

Taos
Northern Rio Grande National Heritage Area